Marand County is in East Azerbaijan province, Iran. The capital of the county is the city of Marand. At the 2006 census, the county's population was 229,215 in 59,097 households. The following census in 2011 counted 239,209 people in 69,471 households. At the 2016 census, the county's population was 244,971 in 75,711 households.

Administrative divisions

The population history of Marand County's administrative divisions over three consecutive censuses is shown in the following table. The latest census shows two districts, nine rural districts, and five cities. Koshksaray Rural District was separated from the Central District in 2019, becoming Koshksaray District and dividing into two rural districts and the city of Koshksaray.

References

 

Counties of East Azerbaijan Province